Australia women's national hockey team may refer to:

 Australia women's national field hockey team
 Australia women's national ice hockey team
 Australia women's national inline hockey team